Roots Of Style is Toshinori Yonekura's 12th original studio album. The album was recorded in New York City with producer "Prince Charles" Alexander.

Track list

Personnel 
 Toshinori Yonekura - Vocals, background vocals
 Prince Charles Alexander - Production, drum programming 
 Cliff "Big Daddy" Branch - Keyboards, drum programming
 Elai Tubo - drum programming
 Ira Siegel - Guitar
 Fulani Hart - Keyboards
 Shindigg - Bass

Production 
 Executive Producer - Toshinori Yonekura
 Producer - Prince Charles Alexander, Fulani Hart
 Co-Producer - Cliff "Big Daddy" Branch
 Vocal arrangement - Toshinori Yonkeura
 Mastering - Chris Gehringer
 Art Direction - Tomoaki Sakai
 Design: Azusa Irie
 Styling - Shuhei Yomo, Ryohei Oasa
 Hair & Make-Up - Toshinori Yonekura
 Photography - Takayuki Okada

Charts 

Album - Oricon Sales Chart (Japan)

References 

Toshinori Yonekura albums
2002 albums